Within Finland's borders there are 789 islands of over 1 km2 area. Most of these are inhabited, and with a road connection to the mainland. There are all together 75,818 islands over 0,5 km2 area in Finland and with all the smaller isles, the total number of islands in Finland is 178,947. There are 549 permanently inhabited islands in Finland with no road connection to mainland. Many other islands are used nearly permanently for recreational purposes.

Largest islands by the sea

Largest islands in lakes

See also

 List of islands in the Baltic Sea
 List of islands
 Archipelago Sea

References 

Finland
Islands